Iran competed at the Summer Olympic Games for the first time at the 1948 Summer Olympics in London, England. 36 competitors, all men, took part in 23 events in 5 sports. The country's sole medal was a weightlifting bronze won in the featherweight division by Jafar Salmasi.

Competitors

Medal summary

Medal table

Medalists

Results by event

Basketball 

Men

Boxing 

Men

Shooting 

Open

Weightlifting 

Men

Wrestling 

Men's freestyle

References

External links
Official Olympic Reports
International Olympic Committee results database

Nations at the 1948 Summer Olympics
1948
Summer Olympics
1948 in Iranian sport
Pahlavi Iran